The Surtees TS10 is an open-wheel Formula 2 race car, designed, developed and built by Surtees, for the European Formula Two Championship, in 1972. Briton Mike Hailwood won the championship outright that season, with 55 points, after scoring 8 podium finishes, with 5 of those podiums being race wins. It was powered by a  Ford-Cosworth BDA four-cylinder engine, tuned by Brian Hart, to produce .

References

Formula Two cars
Surtees racing cars
Open wheel racing cars